Xurramobod is an urban-type settlement in Rishton District, in Fergana Region, in Uzbekistan. Its population is 3,000 (2016). It is located about halfway between Kokand and Fergana. It is located at an altitude of 471 meters.

Famous singer Bahodir Mamajonov was born here. Uzbeks, Kyrgyzs and mainly Tajiks have been living in this tiny village for a long time. People here are known for their hospitality and kindness. Another remarkable point is all people here know each other.

The main language of the village is Tajik, which is similar to the Persian language.

References 

Populated places in Fergana Region
Urban-type settlements in Uzbekistan